Ruel railway station is located in the community of Ruel, Ontario, Canada. This station is currently in use by Via Rail. Transcontinental Canadian trains stop here.

External links
 Ruel railway station

Via Rail stations in Ontario
Railway stations in Sudbury District
Canadian National Railway stations in Ontario
Canadian Northern Railway stations in Ontario